Emily Virgin (born October 1, 1986) is an American politician who is the Minority Leader of the Oklahoma House of Representatives. She previously served as House Democratic Caucus Chair.  She was first elected in 2010 at the age of 24 and represents the 44th district, which includes Norman, Oklahoma. Virgin will retire from the Oklahoma House at end of 2022 due to term limits.

Education 
Virgin completed an undergraduate degree in criminology and political science at the University of Oklahoma in 2009.  Virgin was elected to the House while attending law school at the University of Oklahoma, from which she earned her J.D. in 2013.

Political career 
In 2010, she won election to the House against Mike Hunt, a self-employed lawn care professional.  At the time she was the youngest representative in the Democratic caucus, at 24 years old, although two younger Republicans were elected that same year. She campaigned on improving education in Oklahoma and fighting education cuts.  She has stated that she had been interested in public service from a young age.  She did not expect to start a political career so early, but she decided to run when her home seat became open due to term limits on the incumbent.

In 2015, the Oklahoma Legislature considered a religious freedom bill that would allow businesses to refuse services to individuals based on the business owner's religious beliefs, mainly in reference to bakers and photographers opposed to same-sex marriage.  Virgin gained notice for proposing an amendment that would require the businesses to publicly post a notice specifying what classes of patrons they would refuse services to, in an attempt to derail the bill.  The bill stalled the following week.

In May 2017, Virgin was elected House Democratic Caucus Chair; her term was to start the following year.  As of 2017, Virgin is on the Appropriations and Budget Committee, Higher Education and Career Tech Committee, Judiciary – Civil and Environmental Committee, and Public Safety Committee.

On November 15, 2018, Virgin was named the Minority Leader for the Oklahoma House of Representatives, succeeding Steve Kouplen.

References

External links
 
Legislative page

A video interview with Virgin

1986 births
21st-century American politicians
21st-century American women politicians
Democratic Party members of the Oklahoma House of Representatives
Living people
People from Norman, Oklahoma
University of Oklahoma College of Law alumni
Women state legislators in Oklahoma